Kin Veng Ng (born 12 September 1968) is a Macanese racing driver currently competing in the Macau Touring Car Championship. He is a former World Touring Car Championship driver, who made his debut in 2012.

Racing career
Ng began his career in 2002 in the Asian Touring Car Championship, he raced in the championship for several seasons. In 2012 Ng made his World Touring Car Championship debut with China Dragon Racing driving a Chevrolet Cruze LT in the last two rounds in China and Macau. In October 2013 it was announced that he would race in the last three rounds in Japan, China and Macau.

Racing record

Complete World Touring Car Championship results
(key) (Races in bold indicate pole position – 1 point awarded just in first race; races in italics indicate fastest lap – 1 point awarded all races; * signifies that driver led race for at least one lap – 1 point given all races)

References

External links
 

1968 births
Living people
World Touring Car Championship drivers
Macau racing drivers
Asian Touring Car Championship drivers